Upper Austria is one of the nine states or  of Austria. Its capital is Linz. Upper Austria borders Germany and the Czech Republic, as well as the other Austrian states of Lower Austria, Styria, and Salzburg.

History

Origins
For a long period of the Middle Ages, much of what would become Upper Austria constituted Traungau, a region of the Duchy of Bavaria. In the mid-13th century, it became known as the Principality above the Enns River, this name being first recorded in 1264. (At the time, the term "Upper Austria" also included Tyrol and various scattered Habsburg possessions in South Germany.)

Early modern era
In 1490, the area was given a measure of independence within the Holy Roman Empire, with the status of a principality. By 1550, there was a Protestant majority. In 1564, Upper Austria, together with Lower Austria and the Bohemian territories, fell under Holy Roman Emperor Maximilian II.

At the start of the 17th century, the counter-reformation was instituted under Emperor Rudolf II and his successor Matthias. After a military campaign, the area was under the control of Bavaria for some years in the early 17th century.

The Innviertel was ceded from the Electorate of Bavaria to Upper Austria in the Treaty of Teschen in 1779. During the Napoleonic Wars, Upper Austria was occupied by the French army on more than one occasion.

20th century

In 1918, after the collapse of Austria-Hungary, the name Oberösterreich was used to describe the province of the new Austria. After Austria was annexed by Adolf Hitler, the Nazi dictator, who had been born in the Upper Austrian town of Braunau am Inn and raised in Upper Austria, Upper Austria became Reichsgau Oberdonau, although this also included the southern part of the Sudetenland, annexed from Czechoslovakia, and a small part of Styria. In 1945, Upper Austria was partitioned between the American zone to the south and the Soviet zone to the north.

Today, Upper Austria is Austria's leading industrial region. As of 2009, it accounted for approximately a quarter of the country's exports.

Geography

Lakes
 Ausee
 Gosauseen
 Höllerersee
 Nussensee
 Oedter See
 Pichlinger See
 Puckinger See

Demographics
As of January 1, 2021, 1,495,608 people resided in the state, of which 107,318 (7.17%) were EU/EEA/CH/UK citizens and 96,623 (6.46%) were third-country nationals. The majority of the immigrant population in recent decades has come from Germany, Southeastern Europe, and Turkey, with 1.77% from Germany, 1.48% from Bosnia and Herzegovina, 1.19% from Serbia, Montenegro, and Kosovo, and 1.03% from Turkey. Due to the large wave of refugees since the second half of 2015, the number of people from Afghanistan has increased to 6,721 (0.45%) and from Syria to 6,023 (0.4%). The Mühlviertel has been inhabited by a few hundred Sinti since the Middle Ages, very few of whom actually profess to belong to their ethnic group in censuses.

The majority of Upper Austrians are Christian: in 2001, 79.4% of the people still belonged to the Roman Catholic Church, about 4.4% were members of the Evangelical Lutheran Church, 4.0% were Muslims and 8.8% were of no confession. By the end of 2020, the proportion of Catholics had fallen to 62%, while the corresponding proportion of Protestants was about 3.1% of the Upper Austrian population.

Population development
The historical population is given in the following chart:

Economy 
The Gross domestic product (GDP) of the state was 65.9 billion € in 2018, accounting for 17.1% of the Austria's economic output. GDP per capita adjusted for purchasing power was 39,500 € or 131% of the EU27 average in the same year.

Politics
The Upper Austrian state constitution defines Upper Austria as an independent state of the democratic Republic of Austria. In its constitution, Upper Austria also declares its support for a united Europe that is committed to democratic, constitutional, social and federal principles as well as the principle of subsidiarity, preserves the autonomy of the regions and ensures their participation in European decision-making. In its regional constitution, Upper Austria defines its position in Europe as an independent, future-oriented and self-confident region that participates in the further development of a united Europe.

Like Styria, Upper Austria is a swing state that usually has a signal character in nationwide elections. The conservative Austrian People's Party dominates in rural areas, the Social Democratic Party of Austria has its strongholds in the cities of Linz, Wels and Steyr or in the Attnang-Puchheim railroad junction, but the right-wing populist Freedom Party of Austria has also traditionally had a strong presence, for example in the Innviertel.

Administrative divisions

Administratively, the state is divided into 15 districts (Bezirke), three Statutarstädte and 438 municipalities.

Statutory cities
Linz
Steyr
Wels

Districts
Braunau am Inn
Eferding
Freistadt
Gmunden
Grieskirchen
Kirchdorf an der Krems
Linz-Land
Perg
Ried im Innkreis
Rohrbach
Schärding
Steyr-Land
Urfahr-Umgebung
Vöcklabruck
Wels-Land

Historical regions
Historically, Upper Austria was traditionally divided into four viertel or regions: Hausruckviertel, Innviertel, Mühlviertel, and Traunviertel.

Today these do not exist as administrative regions, but are often still spoken about and referred to: for instance, as the term for the local language dialect (e.g. Innviertlerisch), as the term for the local regional cuisine (e.g. Innviertler Küche), or in regional tourism campaigns (e.g. s'Innviertel).

See also
 Austro-Bavarian language
 Linz

Notes

External links

 Upper Austria official website

 
NUTS 2 statistical regions of the European Union
States of Austria